General elections were held in Guatemala on 5 December 1926. The presidential election resulted in a victory for Lázaro Chacón González, who received 88.6% of the vote. Whilst the elections were rigged, the Progressive Liberal Party did manage to win some seats in the Congress.

Results

President

References

Bibliography
Díaz Romeu, Guillermo. “ Del régimen de Carlos Herrera a la elección de Jorge Ubico.” Historia general de Guatemala. 1993-1999. Guatemala: Asociación de Amigos del País, Fundación para la Cultura y el Desarrollo. Volume 5. 1996.
González Davison, Fernando. El régimen Liberal en Guatemala (1871-1944). Guatemala: Universidad de San Carlos de Guatemala. 1987.
García Laguardia, Jorge Mario. “Evolución político-constitucional de la República de Guatemala en el siglo XX: 1920-1986.” La constitución mexicana 70 años después. 1988. México: UNAM. 1988.
Jiménez, Ernesto Bienvenido. Ellos los presidentes. Guatemala: Editorial José de Pineda Ibarra. 1981.
Pitti, Joseph A. Jorge Ubico and Guatemalan politics in the 1920s. Albuquerque: University of New Mexico. Unpublished dissertation. 1975.
Political handbook of the world 1928. New York, 1929.
Taplin, Glen W. Middle American governors. Metuchen: Scarecrow Press. 1972.

Elections in Guatemala
Guatemala
1926 in Guatemala
Presidential elections in Guatemala
Election and referendum articles with incomplete results